I'm a Woman is an album by Peggy Lee that was released in 1963. It was made when the title song was in the charts.

Track listing
"The Alley Cat Song" (Frank Bjorn, Jack Harlen)  – 1:37
"Mama's Gone, Goodbye" (Peter Bocage, A.J. Piron)  – 2:17
"I'm Walkin'" (Antoine Domino, Dave Bartholomew)  – 2:33
"Come Rain or Come Shine" (Harold Arlen, Johnny Mercer)  – 2:31
"There Ain't No Sweet Man That's Worth the Salt of My Tears" (Fred Fisher)  – 3:08
"I'm a Woman" (Jerry Leiber and Mike Stoller)  – 2:00
"Mack the Knife" (Kurt Weill, Bertolt Brecht, Marc Blitzstein)  – 2:03
"You're Nobody till Somebody Loves You" (Russ Morgan, Larry Stock, James Cavanaugh)  – 2:40
"I'll Get By" (Fred Ahlert, Roy Turk)  – 2:19
"I Left My Heart in San Francisco" (Douglass Cross, George Cory)  – 2:39
"A Taste of Honey" (Ric Marlow, Bobby Scott)  – 2:18
"One Note Samba" (Antônio Carlos Jobim, Newton Mendonca, Jon Hendricks)  – 2:46

References

1963 albums
Capitol Records albums
Peggy Lee albums
Albums arranged by Benny Carter
Albums produced by Milt Gabler